Chernovsky is a rural locality (a village) in Krasnoyarsky Selsoviet, Ufimsky District, Bashkortostan, Russia. The population was 60 as of 2010. There are 5 streets.

Geography 
Chernovsky is located 23 km northwest of Ufa (the district's administrative centre) by road. Mudarisovo is the nearest rural locality.

References 

Rural localities in Ufimsky District